More Than Movies (styled as more>movies) was a satellite television channel in the United Kingdom and Ireland, available on Sky and as a free-to-air service on Freesat. It launched on 4 October 2010 as Men&Movies, and was the first Freesat exclusive TV channel until it joined the Sky EPG on 4 April 2011. Between November 2011 and January 2012, Men&Movies was also available on Freeview in Manchester.

The channel was aimed at the middle to old aged male viewer, with its programming orientated around war documentaries, classic TV series and the war film genre. More Than Movies joined its sister channel, Movies4Men which transmits other cinematic genres.

On 2 April 2012, Men&Movies +1 was launched.

On 10 January 2013, Men&Movies was rebranded as More Than Movies, with a shift towards airing films and programmes from Sony's back catalogue. On 17 January 2013, Movie Mix began to simulcast the full More Than Movies schedule on Freeview but retained its own Movie Mix branding. After the channel closed, Movie Mix began to broadcast its own programming again.

Programmes
 Baywatch
 Cops
 The Guardian
 Storm Warning
 Providence

References

Movie channels in the United Kingdom
Television channels and stations established in 2010
Television channels and stations disestablished in 2016
Sony Pictures Television